These are the Canadian number-one country albums of 1981, per the RPM Country Albums chart.

1981
1981 record charts